Wen County or Wenxian is a county under the administration of the prefecture-level city of Jiaozuo, in the northwest of Henan Province.

Geography
Wen County lies on the left or north bank of the Yellow River, opposite the county-level cities of Gongyi and Xingyang in the Zhengzhou municipality. On all other sides the county is bordered by constituent parts of Jiaozuo: upriver to its west lies Mengzhou City, inland to its northQinyang City and Bo'ai County, downriver to its east Wuzhi County.

Climate

Administration
The county comprises 7 towns and 3 townships, overseeing 262 village committees and 5 neighbourhoods.  The county executive, legislature and judiciary are in  Wenquan, together with the CPC and PSB branches. Address for executive : #55 Huanghe Rd.

Towns

Townships

Notes and references

County-level divisions of Henan
Jiaozuo